Maxine Clark (née Kasselman, born March 6, 1949, in Coral Gables, Florida) is the founder and former CEO of Build-A-Bear Workshop, an American retailer that sells customizable teddy bears and other stuffed animals.

Education 
Clark graduated from the University of Georgia in Athens, Georgia, in 1971 with a Bachelor of Arts in Journalism. She holds an honorary doctor of laws degree from Saint Louis University School of Law.

Career 
In 2006, she published her first book “The Bear Necessities of Business: Building a Company with Heart”.

After college, she worked at Hecht's, a division of the May Company department store chain, and in 1976 was promoted to the corporate offices in St. Louis, Missouri.   In 1992, Clark became the president of Payless Shoe Source, and left the company in 1996.

In 1997, Clark founded Build-A-Bear Workshop after being inspired during a shopping trip by a friend's 10-year-old daughter when they couldn't find a Beanie Baby they were looking for. The girl commented that they could make the toy at home and that sparked Clark's idea to create a store to make stuffed animals. Nine months later, Build-A-Bear opened its flagship store at the St. Louis Galleria mall in October 1997 and issued an initial public offering in 2004 with 140 stores.  

In 2013, Clark, retired from Build-A-Bear, turning over the CEO's role to Sharon Price John. Clark collected $1.37 million in total compensation in 2013, including a salary of $659,200, bonus and incentive pay totaling $377,138, and $144,365 in stock. She also received $160,415 for a six-month consulting contract plus $25,000 to cover her legal expenses.

References

External links 
 Biography on the Build-A-Bear Website
 

1949 births
Living people
American businesspeople
People from Coral Gables, Florida
University of Georgia alumni
New America (organization)